"Everything About You" is the debut single of American heavy metal band Ugly Kid Joe, originally from their 1991 EP, As Ugly as They Wanna Be. The song gained popularity after being featured in the 1992 hit film Wayne's World and was later included on the band's full-length debut album, America's Least Wanted, which was also released in 1992.

The pop-metal song was a commercial success around the world, peaking at number three on the UK Singles Chart, number nine on the US Billboard Hot 100, and number five in Ireland, the Netherlands, and Norway. In Australia, the song was released as part of the As Ugly as They Wanna Be EP, reaching number four on the ARIA Singles Chart.

The song has been seen as "[signifying] the intersection of fading hair metal and rising grunge by combining the former’s optimistic sound with the latter’s pessimistic lyrics".

Song information
Singer Whitfield Crane said the song is about a cynical childhood friend of the band's. "He's not mean-spirited by any means, but he can sure pick apart any situation. And he always had that charm about him," said Crane.

The song describes, with an uptempo beat, a list of things the lead singer hates or doesn't care about: the weather, "your" family, and "everything about you." In the bridge, the singer admits that he has a bad attitude, but that he enjoys hating everything and refuses to change. The song closes with the well-known couplet "Shave and a Haircut".

The re-recorded version includes a spoken intro by actress Julia Sweeney, in the role of Pat, the overweight androgynous character that appeared on Saturday Night Live, saying "Are you the guys on the beach that hate everything? Eww! Is this some sort of hip music that I don't understand?"

Music video
The music video for the song was directed by Thomas Mignone and features the band playing on a beach in Isla Vista, CA. Mignone spent the entirety of the video's budget on an assortment of inflatable love dolls purchased on the morning of the video shoot from a Hollywood Boulevard adult shop en route to the beach location. A large tank of helium was "borrowed" from a nearby dentist's office and used to inflate the love dolls so that vocalist Whitfield Crane could fly them like kites at the beach. Filming was halted for several hours when the Federal Aviation Administration authorities arrived at the location and informed Mignone that aircraft arriving and departing from nearby Santa Barbara Airport were complaining of nude love dolls in their flight paths. A sheepdog appears in multiple scenes, although filming had to be cut on repeated occasions as the dog would not refrain from urinating on Mark Davis’ drum kit.

Reception
The song found its greatest success in the United Kingdom, where it reached number three in May 1992, and it also reached number nine on the Billboard Hot 100 in the United States. It additionally reached the top 10 in Belgium, Ireland, the Netherlands and Norway and peaked within the top 20 in Germany, Sweden and Switzerland. The single also charted in Australia as part of the As Ugly as They Wanna Be EP, reaching number four and earning a Platinum certification from the Australian Recording Industry Association for shipments exceeding 70,000. Rolling Stone Magazine placed this song and its follow up "Cats in the Cradle" on their list of the "20 Greatest Two-Hit Wonders of All Time", saying for "Everything About You", "this California group straddled the line between the hard-rock hookiness that was waning in popularity in Nirvana's Nineties and more au courant alt-rock surliness on their debut single". AllMusic reviewer Heather Phares, reacted to the song negatively, and called it a "hair metal snark-fest".

Track listings
7-inch single
A. "Everything About You" (clean edit) — 4:06
B. "Whiplash Liquor" — 3:40

UK and European CD single
 "Everything About You" (clean edit) — 4:06
 "Whiplash Liquor" — 3:40
 "Sin City" (AC/DC cover recorded live at the Carnaval, Santa Barbara) — 5:05
 "Everything about You" (dirty version) — 4:14

Charts

Weekly charts

Year-end charts

Certifications

Release history

References

1991 songs
1992 debut singles
Mercury Records singles
Songs written by Whitfield Crane
Ugly Kid Joe songs